Vera Razburgaj (born 6 August 1999) is an American-born Albanian footballer who plays as a midfielder who plays for Albanian club Vllaznia Shkodër.

Early life
Razburgaj was raised in Novi, Michigan.

References

External links 
 
 

1999 births
Living people
Albanian women's footballers
Women's association football midfielders
KFF Vllaznia Shkodër players
People from Novi, Michigan
Soccer players from Michigan
American women's soccer players
Oakland Golden Grizzlies women's soccer players
American people of Albanian descent
Sportspeople of Albanian descent